Union Methodist Episcopal Church, also known as Jones Tabernacle AME Church and Parish House, is a historic Methodist Episcopal church and parish house located in the North Central neighborhood of Philadelphia, Pennsylvania.  It was designed by the noted Philadelphia architects Hazelhurst & Huckel and built in 1888–1889, of cut stone in the Richardsonian Romanesque-style.  The church has an entrance archway with squat Syrian columns; and the building features a prominent front gable, chimneys, towers and pinnacles. The gable has a checkerboard pattern of stone and a Palladian window.  The church interior is divided into two principal levels, a first floor Sunday School, and the second floor sanctuary with balcony.  In the 1930s, the church was sold to Jones Tabernacle AME Church, then under the leadership of Rev. Richard R. Wright, Jr., son of Richard R. Wright (1855-1947).

It was added to the National Register of Historic Places in 1980.

References

External links
Jones Tabernacle AME Church history

African-American historic places
Churches on the National Register of Historic Places in Pennsylvania
Romanesque Revival church buildings in Pennsylvania
Churches completed in 1889
Churches in Philadelphia
North Central, Philadelphia
National Register of Historic Places in Philadelphia